The Kootenai National Wildlife Refuge is a National Wildlife Refuge of the United States located in northern Idaho. It is bordered by the Selkirk Mountains to the west, the Kootenai River to the east, and state lands to the south.

The refuge provides diverse habitat types, especially wetlands and hardwood and coniferous forest. It was established to preserve migration habitat for waterfowl, and more than 300 species of vertebrates inhabit the area, including coyote, Grizzly bear, elk, bald eagle, Great horned owl, cinnamon bear, moose, beaver, kestrel, river otter, red-tailed hawk, white-tailed deer, thirteen species of bats, northern harrier, and black bear.

References

External links
Profile of Kootenai National Wildlife Refuge
Refuge Website

National Wildlife Refuges in Idaho
Protected areas of Boundary County, Idaho
Wetlands of Idaho
Landforms of Boundary County, Idaho